Boyz 3 is a 2022 Indian Marathi-language comedy drama film directed by Vishal Devrukhkar and produced by Everest Entertainment. It stars Parth Bhalerao, Pratik Lad, Sumant Shinde and Vidhula Chaughule in lead roles. Boyz 3 is a third installment of Boyz franchise and was theatrically released on 16 September 2022.

Cast and crew

Cast 

 Parth Bhalerao as Dhungya/Dhungraj
 Pratik Lad as Dhairya/Dhairyasheel
 Sumant Shinde Kabir Gayatri Panigrahi
 Vidhula Chaughule as Keerti Saranjame
 Onkar Bhojne as Narun Madan Bhondwe 
 Poonam Bhagwat as Gulabadaniwali Mulagi
 Samir Chaughule as Sundar Gowda 
 Sameer Dharmadhikari as Kabir's Father 
 Manali Deshmukh as Catering Girl 
 Vinayak Gavande as Bodybuilder 
 Karan Gupta as Dumya's Friend
 Dilip Halyal as Police Inspector 
 Vidyadhar Joshi aa Appa 
 Madhavi Juvekar as Amma
 Digambar Kelekar as Tenya

Crew 

 Executive producer - Amol Bhagat 
 Art - Nitin Borkar 
 Makeup - Saurabh Kapde 
 Costume - Anuttama Nayakavdi 
 Choreographer - Rahul Thombare, Sanjiv Howaldar 
 Action - Pradhumna Kumar Swain, Chaitan D'Souza
 Associate Director - Amol Gharat
 Chief Assistant Director - Avinash Arjun 
 Post Production - Pratik Ambelkar 
 Colorist - Pranab Manna 
 Sound - Dusk Studios 
 Sound Design and mixing - Abhijeet Deo 
 Digital Agency - Visual Junkies
 VFX - Magic Stream Studio
 Publicity design - Lokies Studio

Release 
Boyz 3 was scheduled to be theatrically released on 16 September 2022 in all over India including Maharashtra.

Controversy 
The Karnataka Rakshana Vedike Association opposed to the release of the 'Boyz 3' in Belgaum, objecting to dialogues against the Karnataka police.

Reception

Critical Reception 
Kalpeshraj Kubal of Maharashtra Times gave 3 out of five and write "The film's leading actors Sameer Choughule, Girish Kulkarni and Omkar Bhojane have brought their own style to the film and Vidhula too has done well with the boldness required in her debut. Appreciating the music and cinematography, she said the scenic beauty of Karnataka has been captured by the director and cinematographer in a fitting manner to the screenplay. It's an overall 'Boyz 3' journey to experience."

Box Office 
Boyz 3 has earned ₹4.96 crores in the first week. In the end, the film stopped running with a collection of ₹7.66 crores.

Soundtrack 

Music and lyrics is given by Avdhoot Gupte and Background score is by Aditya Bedekar.

References

External links 

 

2022 films
2020s Marathi-language films
Indian comedy films